The Federal Institute for Geosciences and Natural Resources (Bundesanstalt für Geowissenschaften und Rohstoffe or BGR) is a German agency within the Federal Ministry of Economics and Technology.  It acts as a central geoscience consulting institution for the German federal government. The headquarters of the agency is located in Hanover and there is a branch in Berlin. Early 2013, the BGR employed a total of 795 employees. The BGR, the State Authority for Mining, Energy and Geology and the Leibniz Institute for Applied Geophysics form the Geozentrum Hanover. All three institutions have a common management and infrastructure, and complement each other through their interdisciplinary expertise.

External links 
 Official BGR webpage

References 

Research institutes in Germany
Earth science research institutes